Sum of the Parts is an album by tenor saxophonist/composer-arranger Ed Summerlin, released in 1998 on the Ictus label.

Reception
Los Angeles Times reviewer, and Summerlin's onetime bandmate,Don Heckman, gave the album 3 stars and paid tribute to his erstwhile collaborator.
Veteran tenor saxophonist-composer Ed Summerlin has been effectively venturing through the jazz avant-garde for more than three decades. "Sum of the Parts"  displays the complexities and inherent swing in his dissonant, contrapuntal music. Resonant with influences from George Russell and Ornette Coleman, it nonetheless comes together as one of the genuinely individual voices in the arena of exploratory jazz.

Track listing

Personnel

Bruce Ahrens – trumpet
Ron Finck – alto saxophone
Ed Summerlin – tenor saxophone
Tony Marino – bass
Joe Chambers – drums

All personnel information accessed via JazzLoft.com.

Notes

References

1998 albums
Jazz albums by American artists